Angaaray may refer to:
 Angaaray (1986 film), directed by Rajesh Seth with Rajesh Khanna in the lead role
 Angaaray (1998 film), directed by Mahesh Bhatt with Akshay Kumar in the lead role